Per Nichlas Falk (born 3 February 1971) is a Swedish former professional ice hockey player and an assistant coach for Djurgårdens IF of the Swedish Elitserien (SEL) league.

Falk played almost his entire career with the Djurgården team in the Elitserien. He won two Swedish Championships (2000, 2001) with the club before he officially announced his retirement as a player on April 19, 2011. In the years 2000, 2001 and 2004 he had the best face-off winning percentage in the entire league's regular season.

External links

References 

1971 births
Djurgårdens IF Hockey players
Living people
Swedish ice hockey centres
Ice hockey people from Stockholm
Djurgårdens IF Hockey coaches